The 1941 NCAA Track and Field Championships were the 20th annual track meet to determine the team and individual national champions of men's collegiate track and field in the United States. This year's events were held at Stanford Stadium at Stanford University in Stanford, California.

USC captured the team national championship, their tenth.

Team Result
Note: Top 10 finishers only

See also
 NCAA Men's Outdoor Track and Field Championship
 1940 NCAA Men's Cross Country Championships

References

NCAA Men's Outdoor Track and Field Championship
1941 in sports in California
NCAA